Esenciales: Eclipse is one of three CD set compilation albums (nineteenth overall) set by Latin American Mexican rock band Maná. This compilation includes their greatest hits, combining songs from Sol and Luna (hence the name "Eclipse") and adding Eres Mi Religión which is not included in either Sol or Luna. Maná's Esenciales: Eclipse includes songs such as Vivir Sin Aire, Oye Mi Amor, Cómo Te Deseo, En El Muelle de San Blas and an unreleased song, Te Llevaré Al Cielo. It also includes a song they made with salsa music singer Rubén Blades, Sábanas Frías.  There is also the music video for Eres Mi Religión that is included in the CD.

Track listing

Singles

Music Video
 Eres Mi Religión

Maná compilation albums
2003 compilation albums